Mfuwe is a constituency of the National Assembly of Zambia. It covers the towns of Chikanda, Chikonde, Chimutanda, Kalonje, Mwaleshi and Nabwalya in Lavushimanda District of Muchinga Province.

List of MPs

References

Constituencies of the National Assembly of Zambia
1991 establishments in Zambia
Constituencies established in 1991